Jennifer Haigh  is an American novelist and short story writer.

Life 
She was born in Barnesboro, a Western Pennsylvania coal town 85 miles northeast of Pittsburgh in Cambria County. She attended Dickinson College in Carlisle, Pennsylvania, and earned a Master of Fine Arts degree from the Iowa Writers' Workshop in 2002.  Her fiction has been published in Granta, Ploughshares, Guernica, and many other publications, including The Best American Short Stories anthology. She was awarded a Guggenheim Fellowship for fiction in 2018. She lives in Boston.

Awards and honors
2004 PEN/Hemingway Award, Mrs. Kimble
2006 L.L. Winship/PEN New England Award, Baker Towers
2012 short story Paramour included in The Best American Short Stories
2014  PEN/New England Award, News From Heaven
2014 Massachusetts Book Award, News From Heaven
2018 Guggenheim Fellowship, fiction

Bibliography
Her 2003 debut novel Mrs. Kimble — telling the story of a mysterious con man named Ken Kimble through the eyes of his three wives – won the PEN/Hemingway Award for outstanding debut fiction.

Her next novel, Baker Towers (2005), depicts the rise and fall of a western Pennsylvania coal town in the years following World War II. It was a New York Times bestseller and won the 2006 L.L. Winship/PEN New England Award award for best book by a New England writer.

Her third novel, The Condition, was published in July 2008. It traces the dissolution of a proper New England family when their only daughter is diagnosed with Turner's Syndrome, a chromosomal abnormality that keeps her from going through puberty.

Her novel Faith (2011) tells the story of a suburban Boston priest accused of molesting a boy in his parish.

Her short story "Paramour", published in the Winter 2011–12 issue of Ploughshares, was selected for inclusion in the Best American Short Stories anthology in 2012.

In 2013, her short story collection News From Heaven revisited the town of Bakerton, Pennsylvania, and features encore appearances by several characters from the Baker Towers novel.

Her novel Heat and Light (HarperCollins, 2016) explores the effects of natural gas fracking on a small Pennsylvania town, the fictional Bakerton. It was reviewed by The New York Times, The Washington Post, The Wall Street Journal, Boston Globe, Pittsburgh Post Gazette, and National Public Radio.

Novels
 Mrs Kimble (2003)
 Baker Towers (2005)
 The Condition (2008)
 Faith (2011)
 Heat and Light (2016)
 Mercy Street (2022)

Short fiction

 News From Heaven (2013) story collection

References

External links
Jennifer Haigh Official site

Jennifer Haigh reads for "The Drum" Literary Magazine for your ears
 PEN.New England Official site
 "Women Trying to Find Their Way in a Dying Coal Town" from The New York Times.
"Cutaway" A short story from Natural Bridge: A Journal of Contemporary Literature (Number 8, Fall 2002).
"Broken Star" A short story from Granta (Number 103, Autumn 2008).
 A trailer for Faith

Living people
21st-century American novelists
American women novelists
American women short story writers
Dickinson College alumni
Writers from Boston
Writers from Pittsburgh
Iowa Writers' Workshop alumni
1968 births
21st-century American women writers
Hemingway Foundation/PEN Award winners
21st-century American short story writers
Novelists from Pennsylvania
Novelists from Massachusetts